Shyngyrlau is a district of West Kazakhstan Region in western Kazakhstan. The administrative center of the district is the selo of Shyngyrlau. Population:

Geography
The Utva, Ilek, Buldyrtyand Kaldygaity are some of the main rivers of the Ural basin that flow across the territory of the district.

References

Districts of Kazakhstan
West Kazakhstan Region